Forever Alone, Immortal is the debut studio album by the Polish symphonic black metal band Lux Occulta. The 2001 re-release of the album by Metal Mind includes the Sisters of Mercy cover "Burn” as a bonus track; it can also be found on the compilation Maior Arcana.

Track listing
Lyrics By Jaro.Slav; Music By Lux Occulta.
The Kingdom Is Mine (I Saw the Beginning) (6:49)
Homodeus (Throne of Fire) (11:39)
Sweetest Stench of the Dead (The Battlefield) (11:52)
The Third Eye (Illuminatio) (9:37)
Apokathastasis (Out of Chaos) (7:26)
Bitter Taste of Victory (8:42)

Personnel
Jaro.Slav: Vocals
G'Ames, Peter: Guitars
Damian Kurasz: Guest Lead Guitar On Track 2
U.Reck: Keyboards & Acoustic Guitar
Ewa Pogwizd: Cello
Barbara Pizun: Flute, Vocals
Jackie: Bass
Aemil: Drums, Percussion

Production
Executive Producer: Pagan Records
Produced By Lux Occulta & Mariusz Kurasz
Engineered, Mixed & Mastered By Andrzej Rdultowski

External links
"Forever Alone, Immortal" at discogs.com: link

References

1996 debut albums
Lux Occulta albums